"Smuglyanka", "Smuglianka", or "Smugljanka" ( "the dark girl", from смуглый "dark, swarthy"; also , romanized: Smugljanka-Moldovanka "the dark Moldovan girl" (swarthy)) is a Russian song written in 1940 by Yakov Shvedov (lyrics) and Anatoliy Grigorevich Novikov (music). It was commissioned by the Kiev Military Districts political office for the District Song and Dance Ensemble, as part of a suite in honour of Grigory Kotovsky, leader of two Moldovan rebellions in Bessarabia Governorate against the Russian Empire in 1905 and 1915. It is written in the style of a Moldovan folk song.

The song was intended to glorify the female partisans of the Russian Civil War. The lyrics tell how the singer met a pretty girl gathering grapes and tried to seduce her, but how the girl turns out to be a partisan and convinces him to join the partisans as well.

The song was not performed as part of the suite as it was considered too frivolous. In 1940, songs composed for the troops on the front were supposed to be about revenge and victory. By 1942, fashions had changed, and songs with more romantic or lyrical themes were accepted by the military, so Novikov decided to re-release a revised version of the song. But it was again shelved for another two years, and its first performance came in 1944, in the Tchaikovsky Concert Hall in Moscow, by the Alexandrov Ensemble, with soloist Nikolaiy Ustinov. It was an immediate success, and had to be repeated three times as the audience requested encores. Because the song became famous outside of its original context of the Kotovsky Suite, it was taken as a reference to the then-contemporary Soviet partisans of the Great Patriotic War (WWII). Goncharova (2010) notes that the image of the pretty Moldovan partisan is a lyrical fantasy, as out of some 3,000 known Soviet partisans active in Moldova, few were ethnic Moldovans.

Smuglyanka was used in the 1973 Soviet film Only "Old Men" Are Going to Battle, an "easy movie about love, airplanes and girls" (Goncharova 2010). In the film, a young fighter pilot introduces the song to his squadron and so gets nicknamed "the dark girl". The film was first shown on 27 December 1973. Hero of the Soviet Union Alexander Pokryshkin was reportedly wiping his eyes as the lights came back on. The film became a blockbuster, seen by 54 million viewers within five months,  and Smuglyanka as a consequence became known throughout the Soviet Union, entering the standard repertoire of Russian folk songs. Shvedov had not been told about the use of his song in the film and learned about it from movie-going friends.

Lyrics

References

Yuliya Goncharova (Юлия Гончарова, Shvedov's granddaughter) "Смуглянку" не пускали на фронт. Moskovskij Komsomolets № 25343, 5 May 2010.

 Smuglyanka in the Soviet film Only "Old Men" Are Going to Battle (min. 1:58)

Soviet songs
Russian folk songs
Russian military songs
1940 songs
Moldovan folk culture
Fakelore